A list of first ever novel written in various languages.

References 

Lists of novels
Literature by language
Lists by language
Lists of firsts